Asero High School is a secondary school in Abeokuta, Ogun State, Nigeria, founded and established in 1980. Its original site for the first two academic years was in an old military barracks situated just north of an area called Adatan. By September 1982, the school moved to its new and current location further north in Asero situated on the A5 Federal Abeokuta-Ibadan Road.

Asero High School produced its first O'level (governed by West African Examinations Council) Students in June 1985 who became the first graduating students of AHS.

References

Secondary schools in Ogun State
Schools in Abeokuta
Educational institutions established in 1980
1980 establishments in Nigeria